Vento was a motorcycle, scooter and ATV manufacturer from the United States. The name of the company is Italian for "wind". The company was founded in Mexico in 1996. Parts come from Italy, China, Japan and Taiwan, with some of its suppliers also selling to Harley-Davidson.

Facilities
In 1998, an assembly and quality control plant was opened in Laredo, Texas. This plant was built to elevate the quality of its products to better compete. All of the components were brought to Laredo where they were assembled and quality control work was performed.

Vento's corporate office was located in San Diego, California, where various operations varying from product design and development to customer support took place. Vento's sales organization is structured in the United States through a network of over 175 dealers in more than 30 states; there are more than 300 Vento outlets worldwide. FY 2003 sales in the United States totaled 17,840 units. A sum of 77,600 Vento motorcycles was sold that same year in Chile, Dominican Republic, Guatemala, Mexico, Venezuela, Puerto Rico, and Russia combined. (Includes highway motorcycles, scooters, utility, and ATVs). Vento sells more small-displacement two-wheel vehicles in Mexico than Yamaha, Suzuki, Honda, and Kawasaki combined.

Products
Vento products were approved by the National Highway Traffic Safety Administration (United States Department of Transportation), and certified by both the United States Environmental Protection Agency and the California Air Resources Board, meeting the emission regulations.

Vento motorcycles have somewhat bulky bodies which resemble larger cruisers made by other manufacturers, but their V-twin  engines are comparatively small.

References

External links
 Official Vento−global website
 Official Vento−U.S. website

Defunct motorcycle manufacturers of the United States
Motorcycles introduced in the 1990s
Vehicle manufacturing companies established in 1996
Vehicle manufacturing companies disestablished in 2008